Martina Peterlini (born 24 October 1997) is an Italian World Cup alpine ski racer

World Championship results

References

External links
 

1997 births
Living people
Italian female alpine skiers
Alpine skiers of Fiamme Oro
People from Rovereto
Sportspeople from Trentino